The year 2018 is the 15th year in the history of the Wu Lin Feng, a Chinese kickboxing promotion.

List of events

Wu Lin Feng 2018: World Championship in Shenzhen

Wu Lin Feng 2018: World Championship in Shenzhen was a kickboxing event held on February 3, 2018 in Shenzhen, Guangdong, China.

Results

Wu Lin Feng 2018: World Championship Tianjin

Wu Lin Feng 2018: World Championship Tianjin was a kickboxing event held on February 3, 2018 in Tianjin, China.

Results

Wu Lin Feng 2018: -60kg World Championship Tournament

Wu Lin Feng 2018: -60kg World Championship Tournament was a kickboxing event held on March 10, 2018 in Jiaozuo, Henan, China.

Results

Wu Lin Feng 2018: Greece VS China - Gods of War 11

Wu Lin Feng 2018: Greece VS China - Gods of War 11 was a kickboxing event held on March 24, 2018 in Athens, Greece.

Results

Wu Lin Feng 2018: World Championship Shijiazhuang

Wu Lin Feng 2018: World Championship Shijiazhuang was a kickboxing event held on April 07, 2018 in Shijiazhuang, Hebei, China.

Results

Wu Lin Feng 2018: Czech Republic VS China

Wu Lin Feng 2018: Czech Republic VS China was a kickboxing event held on April 19, 2018 in Prague, Czech Republic.

Results

Wu Lin Feng 2018: World Championship Nanyang

Wu Lin Feng 2018: World Championship Nanyang was a kickboxing event held on May 05, 2018 in Nanyang, Henan, China.

Results

Wu Lin Feng 2018: World Championship Yichun

Wu Lin Feng 2018: World Championship Yichun was a kickboxing event held on May 19, 2018 in Yichun, Jiangxi, China.

Results

Wu Lin Feng 2018: Yi Long VS Saiyok

Wu Lin Feng 2018: Yi Long VS Saiyok was a kickboxing event held on June 02, 2018 in Chongqing, China.

Results

Wu Lin Feng 2018: China vs Netherlands & Russia

Wu Lin Feng 2018: China vs Netherlands & Russia was a kickboxing event held on June 16, 2018 in Shenyang, China.

Results

Wu Lin Feng 2018: WLF -67kg World Cup 2018-2019 1st Round

Wu Lin Feng 2018: WLF -67kg World Cup 2018-2019 1st Round was a kickboxing event held on June 16, 2018 in Zhengzhou, China.

Results

Wu Lin Feng 2018: WLF x Krush 90 - China vs Japan

Wu Lin Feng 2018: WLF x Krush 90 - China vs Japan was a kickboxing event held on July 22, 2018 in Tokyo, Japan.

Results

Wu Lin Feng 2018: WLF -67kg World Cup 2018-2019 2nd Round

Wu Lin Feng 2018: WLF -67kg World Cup 2018-2019 2nd Round was a kickboxing event held on August 04, 2018 in Zhengzhou, China.

Results

Wu Lin Feng 2018: WLF x OSS Fighters - China vs Romania

Wu Lin Feng 2018: WLF x OSS Fighters - China vs Romania was a kickboxing event held on August 24, 2018 in Mamaia, Romania.

Results

Wu Lin Feng 2018: WLF -67kg World Cup 2018-2019 3rd Round

Wu Lin Feng 2018: WLF -67kg World Cup 2018-2019 3rd Round was a kickboxing event held on September 01, 2018 in Zhengzhou, China.

Results

Wu Lin Feng 2018: WLF -67kg World Cup 2018-2019 4th Round

Wu Lin Feng 2018: WLF -67kg World Cup 2018-2019 4th Round was a kickboxing event held on October 06, 2018 in Shangqiu, China.

Results

Wu Lin Feng 2018: China vs Canada

Wu Lin Feng 2018: China vs Canada was a kickboxing event held on October 13, 2018 in Markham, Ontario, Canada.

Results

Wu Lin Feng 2018: WLF -67kg World Cup 2018-2019 5th Round

Wu Lin Feng 2018: WLF -67kg World Cup 2018-2019 5th Round was a kickboxing event held on November 03, 2018 in China.

Results

Wu Lin Feng 2018: China vs Australia

Wu Lin Feng 2018: China vs Australia was a kickboxing event held on November 04, 2018 in Melbourne, Australia.

Results

Wu Lin Feng 2018: WLF x KF1

Wu Lin Feng 2018: WLF x KF1 was a kickboxing event held on November 07, 2018 in Hong Kong.

Results

Wu Lin Feng 2018: WLF -67kg World Cup 2018-2019 6th Round

Wu Lin Feng 2018: WLF -67kg World Cup 2018-2019 6th Round was a kickboxing event held on December 01, 2018 in Zhengzhou, China.

Results

Wu Lin Feng 2018: WLF x S1 - China vs Thailand

Wu Lin Feng 2018: WLF x S1 - China vs Thailand was a kickboxing event held on December 08, 2018 in Thailand.

Results

See also
2018 in Glory
2018 in Glory of Heroes
2018 in Kunlun Fight
2018 in K-1

References

2018 in kickboxing
Kickboxing in China
Sport in Timișoara